Slobodan "Barney" Djordjevic was an American soccer forward who earned one cap with the U.S. national team in a 2-1 World Cup qualification loss to Mexico on September 10, 1972 in Los Angeles. Djordjevic played in the German American Soccer League and was in the stands to watch the game. Through an error by the United States Soccer Federation, the team was short handed and Djordjevic came out of the stands to start the game.  Johnny Moore replaced him at halftime.

References

American soccer players
United States men's international soccer players
German-American Soccer League players
American people of Serbian descent
Living people
Association football forwards
Year of birth missing (living people)